Lucian Colceriu (born 8 September 1968 in Lunca Bradului) is a Romanian former rugby union footballer who played as a wing.

Club career
During his career Colceriu played mostly for Romanian club Steaua București.

International career
Colceriu gathered 26 caps for Romania, from his debut in 1991 to his last game in 1998. He scored 7 tries during his international career, 35 points on aggregate. He was a member of his national side for the 2nd and 3rd Rugby World Cups in 1991 and 1995 and played 4 group matches without scoring.

Honours
Steaua București
 Divizia Națională: 1991-92

References

External links

1968 births
Living people
Romanian rugby union players
Romania international rugby union players
CSA Steaua București (rugby union) players
Rugby union wings
People from Mureș County